Nick Kyrgios was the reigning champion from when the tournament was last held in 2019, but lost in the first round to Mackenzie McDonald.

Jannik Sinner won his maiden ATP Tour 500 title, defeating McDonald in the final, 7–5, 4–6, 7–5. With the victory, Sinner became the youngest player and first teenager on the ATP Tour to win an ATP Tour 500 title.

Seeds
All seeds receive a bye into the second round.

Draw

Finals

Top half

Section 1

Section 2

Bottom half

Section 3

Section 4

Qualifying

Seeds

Qualifiers

Qualifying draw

First qualifier

Second qualifier

Third qualifier

Fourth qualifier

Fifth qualifier

Sixth qualifier

References

External links
Main draw
Qualifying draw

2021 ATP Tour